Michael Mendl (born Michael Sandrock; 20 April 1944) is a German actor. He has appeared in more than 100 films since 1975. He is best known internationally for his role in Downfall, the 2004 movie about Adolf Hitler's final days inside the Führerbunker.

Selected filmography

Awards
 Bavarian Film Awards for Best Supporting Actor 14 Days to Life (1998)
 Golden camera award for Best German Actor In the Shadow of Power (2004)
 Jupiter Award for Best German TV Actor The Visit (2009)

References

External links
 
 Discogs profile

1944 births
Living people
People from Lünen
German male film actors
German male television actors
20th-century German male actors
21st-century German male actors